Zagra is a municipality located in the province of Granada, Spain.

Economy
Zagra is a largely arable town where farming is the main economic activity. Crops grown include tomatoes, apples, and meat is also produced here, as well as milk.

Farms are small independent ones that are family-run.

Population
According to the 2004 census (INE), the city has a population of 1094 inhabitants.

References

Municipalities in the Province of Granada